The Insurance Building is a government building in Olympia, Washington that houses the offices of the Insurance Commissioner and State Auditor.

History
The Insurance Building, along with other government buildings on the Washington state capitol campus, was designed by the New York architectural team of Walter Wilder and Harry White. It was the second facility built on the new capital campus, following completion of the Temple of Justice, and was constructed from Wilkeson stone, a durable sandstone mined from quarries in Pierce County, Washington. 

The cornerstone of the building was laid on April 30, 1920 in a Masonic ceremony overseen by Thomas Skaggs, a Masonic grand master and chairman of the state's Board of Control, and was preceded by a ceremonial processional formed by the Knights Templar of Tacoma and accompanied by the band of the Affifi Temple of the Nobles of the Mystic Shrine. A dedication address was delivered by Governor Louis Hart. It was completed the following year with a final reported cost, including furnishings, of $1,087,497.97.

During the 1949 Olympia earthquake, the Insurance Building was one of the two most heavily damaged structures in Olympia. Fifty years later, after the adjacent Legislative Building was damaged during the Nisqually earthquake, the office of the Governor of Washington was temporarily relocated to the Insurance Building.

Design

The facility is a rectangular structure oriented with the longer axis running north and south. To the north of the building is the "Winged Victory Monument," the state's memorial to World War I veterans, designed by Alanzo Victor Lewis and installed in 1938. The north and south ends of the building have colonnades supporting an unembellished frieze and pediment, while the east and west sides of the structure consist of rows of windows.

See also
 Washington state capitol

References

Government of Washington (state)
Government buildings completed in 1921
Washington State Capitol campus